Richard Tenison may refer to:

 Richard Tennison (1642–1705), Irish bishop
 Richard Tenison (politician), Irish M.P